The FIM Ice Speedway of Nations, formerly known as the Ice Speedway Team World Championship, is an international ice speedway competition, first held in Kalinin (Tver), USSR, in 1979. Since its establishment, the tournament has been noted by a continued Russian dominance: the Soviet Union, Commonwealth of Independent States and Russia have won all but three tournaments. The only non-Russian teams to have won were West Germany in 1983, and Sweden - in 1985, 1995 and 2002.

List of championships

See also 
 Ice speedway
 Ice racing
 Individual Ice Speedway World Championship

References

External links 
 FIM Regulations

Ice speedway competitions
Speedway
Speedway, Ice